East Yangoru Rural LLG is a local-level government (LLG) of East Sepik Province, Papua New Guinea.

Wards
01. Pachen/Karapia
02. Yangoru Station
03. Numboguon
04. Baimuru
05. Bukienduon
06. Marambanja
07. Sima
08. Howi/Wamaina
09. Kufar/Ambokon
10. Siniangu/Mombuk
11. Witupe1
12. Koro
13. Makambu
14. Kiniambu
15. Haripmo 1, 2, 3
16. Merohombi
17. Kwagwie
18. Hagama
19. Soli
20. Parimuru
21. Ambukanja
22. Kiarivu
23. Kworabri
24. Simbomie/Sengri
25. Yekimbolye 2
26. Kamanja
27. Witupe 2

References

Local-level governments of East Sepik Province